Joey Leung Wing-Chung (born September 10, 1965), is a Hong Kong actor, director, screenwriter / playwright, program host (TV & Radio) and drama tutor.

Career
He has starred in movies such as Girl Boxer (2004), Master of Martial Arts (1997) and Kung Fu King (2005). He hosted the show Minutes to Fame with Hacken Lee.

In September 2008, he started and hosted a show from RTHK (有冇搞錯). On June 6, 2011 he announced that he was leaving the show for another one on the same radio station (瘋 Show 快活人). This announcement created a lot of mixed feelings from his fans. He left the program (瘋 Show 快活人) on Nov 25, 2016. Then, he started a new program called 60 minutes with Joey Leung (一個鐘一個梁榮忠) on June 25, 2017 every Sunday from 12 pm to 1 pm.

Personal life
He has a collection of Gundam merchandises and was displayed in the Gundam Expo Hong Kong in 2009.

Filmography

Love on Delivery (1994)
Hail the Judge (1994)
The Bodyguard from Beijing (1994)
Detective Investigation Files I (1995)
Detective Investigation Files II (1995)
Detective Investigation Files III (1997)
As Sure As Fate (1997)
The Legend of Master Chai (1997)
Journey to the West II (1998)
My Date with a Vampire II (1999)
Book and Sword, Gratitude and Revenge (2002)
Heavenly In-Laws (2007)

References

1965 births
Living people
Alumni of The Hong Kong Academy for Performing Arts
Hong Kong male film actors
Hong Kong male television actors
TVB actors
20th-century Hong Kong male actors
21st-century Hong Kong male actors